Henry Holdsby Simmonds was a sailor from Canada, who represented his country at the 1932 Summer Olympics in Los Angeles, US.

Sources
 

1883 births
1954 deaths
Canadian male sailors (sport)
Sailors at the 1932 Summer Olympics – Star
Olympic sailors of Canada